Glenkeen is a civil parish in County Tipperary.

Glenkeen may also refer to:
Glenkeen (townland), one of the 78 townlands in the above parish
Glenkeen, County Fermanagh, a townland in County Fermanagh, Northern Ireland
Glenkeen, County Londonderry, a townland in County Londonderry, Northern Ireland
Glenkeen, County Tyrone, a townland in County Tyrone, Northern Ireland